The 1963 Star World Championships were held in Chicago, Illinois in 1963.

Results

References

Star World Championships
1963 in sailing
Star World Championships in the United States